Pariak is a  boma in  Kolnyang payam, Bor South County, Jonglei State, South Sudan.  Pariak town is a regional trading hub located about 30 kilometers south of Bor along the Bor-Juba road.  It is the most populous boma in  Kolnyang payam.

Demographics
According to the Fifth Population and Housing Census of Sudan, conducted in April 2008, Pariak  boma had a population of 22,619 people, composed of 11,583 male and 11,036 female residents.

Infrastructure
In 2008, Kuol Manyang, then the Governor of Jonglei State, announced that the Government of South Sudan had contracted a Chinese construction firm to build a bridge across the Bahr al Jabal river at Pariak, linking Jonglei State and what was then Lakes State.  The bridge was never built.

Notes

References 

Populated places in Jonglei State